, stylized as ZUTOMAYO, is a Japanese rock group that debuted in 2018. Secretive by nature, the group has never released a full member list, crediting different people for music, arrangements, and music video production each time. The only member reoccurring in all of the group's output is the vocalist, an unidentified woman named .

Despite the little information released, the group is commercially successful. Zutomayo's three EP's have reached 8th, 1st, and 2nd on the Oricon Albums Chart, respectively. The group was also invited to perform at the 2019 Fuji Rock Festival a year after their debut.

Style
Aside from ACA-Ne, the vocalist, it is unclear how many people are in the band. ACA-Ne has never revealed her face, and the band have performed behind a translucent screen during concerts, including at the 2019 Fuji Rock Festival. Many have pointed to Zutomayo's secrecy regarding its members contributing towards its popularity. In more recent performances however, other members of the band have been less secretive, choosing to show their faces. 

Zutomayo typically produces rock music, often featuring intricate, funk-inspired basslines. ACA-Ne's voice has been described as "energetic", "expressive", and "delicate".

History
The group debuted with the release of their first song, via YouTube on June 4, 2018. The song became an immediate hit, garnering 200,000 views within the first week. Additionally, after being released on streaming platforms on August 30, the song became the most streamed song in Japan that week. Following the song's release, Zutomayo held their first concert at Daikanyama Loop in Tokyo. Attendees were handed opaque glasses and reported that the entire venue was dark for the concert's duration. The group would continue to conceal their identities in future concerts.

Zutomayo released two more singles digitally before releasing their first EP, on November 14 through EMI Records. The EP reached 8th on the Oricon Albums Chart and was nominated in the 19th CD Shop Awards. On June 5, 2019, a second EP was released titled , which topped the Oricon chart. The group's first full-length album, was released on October 30 of the same year. The song "Darken" was used in the live-action film The Night Beyond the Tricornered Window, and "Hypersomnia" is also featured in the film. The group released  on February 10, 2021, featuring songs "One's Mind", "Can't Be Right", "STUDY ME", "Hunch Gray", "Have a", "Engine Oil", "Darken", "Milabo", "Loneliness", "Crop", "Hypersomnia", "Fastening", and "Inner Heart".

In October 2022, the group provided the second ending theme, for the anime Chainsaw Man.

Discography
As of February 2022, Zutomayo has released four EPs and two full-length albums. Some songs contained in these albums were released digitally before the album's release.

Studio albums

Extended plays

Compilation extended plays

Singles

Promotional singles

References

External links 
  

Musical groups established in 2018
2018 establishments in Japan
Japanese pop music groups
Japanese rock music groups
EMI Records artists
Universal Music Japan artists